Wang Zhizhen  (born July 6, 1942 in Suzhou  Jiangsu), also known as Chih-Chen Wang, is a Chinese biophysicist and professor at the Institute of Biophysics, Chinese Academy of Sciences. She also served as Vice Chairperson of the 11th and 12th Central Committee of the Jiusan Society and Vice Chairperson of the 12th Chinese People's Political Consultative Conference.

Life 
Wang Zhizhen graduated from University of Science and Technology of China in 1964, then started to work at  Institute of Biophysics of Chinese Academy of Sciences after graduation as an intern researcher. She became a researcher in 1993. She was elected academician of the Chinese Academy of Sciences in November 2001.

References

1942 births
Living people
Biologists from Jiangsu
Chinese biophysicists
Chinese women biologists
Chinese women physicists
Educators from Suzhou
Members of the Chinese Academy of Sciences
Members of the Jiusan Society
Vice Chairpersons of the National Committee of the Chinese People's Political Consultative Conference
People's Republic of China politicians from Jiangsu
Politicians from Suzhou
Physicists from Jiangsu
University of Science and Technology of China alumni
TWAS fellows
TWAS laureates
Women biophysicists